

United States
According to the USGS GNIS, the United States has 144 peaks named Bear Mountain:

Alaska
According to the USGS GNIS, the state of Alaska in the United States has 10 peaks named Bear Mountain:

Arkansas

Arizona

California

Colorado
According to the USGS GNIS, the state of Colorado in the United States has 10 peaks named Bear Mountain:

Connecticut

Idaho

Maine
According to the USGS GNIS, the state of Maine in the United States has 11 peaks named Bear Mountain:

Massachusetts

Missouri

Montana

New Hampshire

New Mexico

North Carolina

New York

Oklahoma

Oregon

Pennsylvania

Texas

Virginia

Vermont

Washington
According to the USGS GNIS, the state of Washington in the United States has 9 peaks named Bear Mountain.

Wyoming

Other states
These are states that have only one peak named Bear Mountain.

References